Bertram "Bert" Johnson (born October 20, 1973) is a Democratic former member of the Michigan Senate and a convicted criminal.

Johnson previously represented the 2nd district, which comprises northeast Detroit, Highland Park, Hamtramck, Harper Woods and all five Grosse Pointe Communities. From 2007 to 2010, Johnson served as a member of the Michigan House of Representatives.

Education
Johnson attended University of Detroit Jesuit High School and Academy. He subsequently attended the University of Detroit Mercy, where he studied Criminology and Security Administration.

Criminal and civil history

Armed robbery
On May 27, 1993, Johnson participated in the break-in and armed robbery of a cash box from the Oakland Hills Country Club, where he worked a caddy. Johnson pleaded "no contest" to felony charges of armed robbery and breaking and entering and was sentenced to eight months in prison, followed by three years on probation.

Driving on a suspended license
In April 2007, Johnson was spotted leaving the state Capitol behind the wheel of a 2001 Jaguar despite having a suspended license and an invalid plate.

Conspiracy and theft

FBI raid and indictment on federal charges
On March 27, 2017, Johnson's home and Senate office were searched in a raid jointly conducted by the Federal Bureau of Investigation (FBI) and the Michigan State Police. During the raid, FBI agents seized a Western Field 12-gauge shotgun and a Remington 16-gauge shotgun. Johnson was not allowed to own firearms due to his 1993 felony conviction.

In April 2017, Johnson was indicted by a grand jury on federal charges of conspiracy and theft, for using federal funds to pay a "ghost employee" on his Senate payroll who did no actual work. Due to his indictment, a recall petition was filed against Johnson by Robert Davis. On April 18, 2017, Johnson was arraigned in front of Magistrate David R. Grand in the United States District Court for the Eastern District of Michigan, pleaded not guilty and was released on a $10,000 personal recognizance bail.

Guilty plea
In February 2018, federal prosecutors offered Johnson a plea deal. The deal involved Johnson pleading guilty to conspiracy to commit theft from a federally funded program, a charge punishable by up to five years in federal prison. In return, prosecutors would have dropped a second theft charge, a 10-year felony. Johnson rejected this plea deal and requested to go to trial.

On March 2, 2018, Johnson pled guilty to conspiracy to commit theft, admitting that he put a "ghost employee" on the Senate payroll for almost a year, paying her $23,000 for no work. The "ghost employee", Glynis Thornton, cooperated with authorities after getting targeted in another corruption scheme involving state-run Detroit Education Achievement Authority principals who took bribes. Thornton secretly recorded a conversation with Johnson regarding the scheme at his home in November 2015.

Federal prosecutors sought a 12-month prison sentence, but U.S. District Judge Matthew Leitman sentenced Johnson to only 90 days in jail. Johnson was also ordered to pay $23,134 in restitution to the state.

"Ghost employee" scheme

In October 2013, Johnson asked Thornton for a $30,000 loan, she said no. Johnson then asked Thornton for $20,000. Again, the answer was "no." Johnson tried a third time asking for $10,000, which Thornton granted. Over the next five months, Thornton sought repayment for the loan, but Johnson didn't have the money. Sometime in March 2014, Johnson proposed to Thornton that he could repay her his personal loan by putting Thornton on his Michigan Senate Office payroll for repayment. Thornton agreed to Johnson's plan and Thornton was hired as a "community liaison" on March 28, 2014. Thornton was paid $22 an hour for her no-show job.

Three days after putting Thornton on his Senate payroll, Johnson asked her for an additional $4,000. Thornton had an employee issue a check, cash it and give the money to the Johnson. By October 2014, Johnson needed more money. He asked Thornton for $3,000 cash for payment of his property taxes. Johnson picked up the cash from Thornton's home and repaid this loan."

Thornton remained on the Johnson's payroll until January 2015. In all, she received $23,205 but provided no work.

Resignation as state senator
Three hours after admitting he stole from the taxpayers, Johnson submitted his resignation from his Senate seat. In a one-sentence letter, Johnson wrote: "It is with profound regret that I tender my resignation, effective March 2, 2018."

Civil judgments

Eviction from campaign office
Johnson was evicted from his campaign office in 2010. In 2015, Johnson paid a $7,446 bill after a nearly five-year legal battle with the landlord ended in a court order. The company had been unable to collect in 2011 because Johnson owed child support to multiple women in Oakland and Wayne counties.

Unpaid consulting fees
The Southfield-based Foster McCollum White and Associates consulting firm sued Johnson in 2012, alleging he stiffed it on a $10,000 bill and then hurt the business by badmouthing it as the firm sought another contract. A court eventually ordered Johnson to pay $2,500, and it took 15 months for him to settle the debt.

Johnson owes the Chicago-based Paladin Political Group more than $29,000 for 2013 fundraising work. His failure to pay a court-ordered judgment prompted a bench warrant for his arrest in 2015, which was resolved, but Paladin Political Group said he still hadn't paid up. "We tried to put him under collections, but we were told to get in line," Managing Partner Dave Seman said.

Campaign finance violations
Johnson also failed to make disclosures required under the Michigan Campaign Finance Act, accumulating nearly $16,000 in late fees between his candidate committee and a political action fund. Michigan Secretary of State records showed that Johnson's official candidate committee failed to file three required reports in 2016 and the first report of 2017. The committee owed $4,000 in late fees, and $1,000 of that amount was referred to the Treasury Department for collection.

The "Consensus PAC" linked to Johnson and started by a former staffer owes $11,775. The Michigan Secretary of State referred $9,775 of that amount to the state Treasury Department for collection.

Political career
From 2001-2006, Johnson worked as chief of staff to then-Representative Bill McConico.

2007 House election
Term limits forced McConico out of office at the end of 2007, and Johnson won a 12-candidate primary to succeed him in the heavily Democratic state House District 5. Former House Speaker Craig DeRoche considered not seating Johnson in the state House because of his felony criminal record, but the Highland Park Democrat was sworn in and seated by January 2007.

While serving in the State House, Johnson was named Chair of the "Detroit Caucus", which is composed of the twelve State Representatives and five State Senators whose districts include Detroit. He was also Chair of the House Committee on Regulatory Reforms and sat on the Health Policy, Energy and Technology, Banking and Financial Services and Public Employee Health Care Reform committees.

2010 Senate election
In 2010, Senator Martha G. Scott was forced to vacate the 2nd Senate District due to term limits. In the August 2010 Primary, Johnson beat out former State Representative Ken Daniels. After the election, Johnson was named the campaign chair of the Senate Democratic Caucus.

During his legislative tenure, Johnson possessed the worst attendance record in the state Legislature. No state legislator missed more votes than Johnson, who has missed 712 of 5,115 roll calls, according to data compiled by MichiganVotes.org.

2012 U.S. Congress election
Johnson lost a 2012 bid for the U.S. House, finishing fourth in a Democratic primary dominated by John Conyers.

2014 Senate election
Instead of challenging Conyers again, Johnson chaired Conyers' re-election campaign in 2014, while cruising to re-election in the Michigan Senate.

Future prospects
Due to his conviction on a felony involving “dishonesty, deceit, fraud or a breach of the public trust”, Johnson is barred under state law from holding state or local office for 20 years.

Personal life
Johnson is single with four children. He has one daughter, India and three sons, Bertram, Nicholas and David.

See also
Michigan House of Representatives
Michigan Senate
Michigan Democratic Party

External links

Campaign Finance
Voting Records

References

1973 births
Living people
21st-century American politicians
Politicians from Detroit
African-American state legislators in Michigan
Democratic Party Michigan state senators
Democratic Party members of the Michigan House of Representatives
University of Detroit Jesuit High School and Academy alumni
American campaign managers
American political consultants
21st-century African-American politicians
20th-century African-American people
Michigan Democrats
Michigan politicians convicted of crimes
Criminals from Michigan
American male criminals
21st-century American criminals
Political scandals in the United States
Political controversies in the United States
2017 controversies in the United States